Metamecynopsis duodecimguttata is a species of beetle in the family Cerambycidae, and the only species in the genus Metamecynopsis. It was described by Hüdepohl in 1995.

References

Apomecynini
Beetles described in 1995
Monotypic beetle genera